Gisela Weiß (later Engelhardt, born 16 October 1943) is a retired German swimmer. She competed at the 1960 Summer Olympics in the 400 m and 4×100 m freestyle events and won a bronze medal in the relay. Between 1959–1961, she won three consecutive national titles in the 4×100 m freestyle relay.

Weiß ended her competitive swimming career in 1963 and began studying  medicine. In 1964, she married Karl-Heinz Engelhardt, a multiple East German champion in swimming. 

After graduating, Weiß worked as a doctor, first at a sports school in Leipzig, and after the German unification in a rehabilitation clinic.

References

1943 births
Living people
German female swimmers
German female freestyle swimmers
Olympic swimmers of the United Team of Germany
Swimmers at the 1960 Summer Olympics
Olympic bronze medalists for the United Team of Germany
Olympic bronze medalists in swimming
Medalists at the 1960 Summer Olympics
20th-century German women
21st-century German women